Edwin Davis French (1851–1906) was a bookplate engraver, who produced at least 330 engravings beginning in 1893.

Born in North Attleboro, Massachusetts, his artistic career had begun in 1869 with silver engraving for the Whiting Manufacturing Company. Later, he became a founding member and trustee of the American Fine Arts Society. Two men who influenced French's work were Albrecht Dürer and Charles W. Sherborn. Many of his patrons belonged to the Grolier Club.

He was interested in constructed languages and was active in the Volapük movement, and also learned Esperanto.

His obituary in the New York Times relates:

Mr. French's hobby was universal language, for he was a facile linguist. He was Secretary of the Volapük Society of America, and had a considerable library in that language. Esperante (sic) and Idiom Neutral similarly attracted him. He was a member of the American Fine Arts Society, the International Academy of Volapuk, Ex-Libres Society of London, Ex-Libres Verein of Berlin, the Grolier Club, National Arts Club, Club of Odd Volumes, and Bibliophile Society.

French had suffered from poor health most of his life, having left Brown University in his sophomore year because of it, and eventually succumbed to tuberculosis.

References

Further reading

External links

University of Rochester Library Bulletin Vol. II #2, February 1947, by Mary E. Oemisch
Journal of Library History, vol. 20 #2, Spring 1985, pp. 196-9, by Robert Nikirk
Bookplates by Edwin Davis French in the University of Delaware Library's William Augustus Brewer Bookplate Collection
Contemporary book citing French and his prominent clients, amongst other bookplate engravers of the era.

1851 births
1906 deaths
American engravers
Artists from Massachusetts
20th-century deaths from tuberculosis
Volapük
Brown University alumni
Tuberculosis deaths in New York (state)